A total of 121 Lost episodes aired between September 22, 2004, and May 23, 2010. J. J. Abrams, who co-created the American serial drama television series Lost with Damon Lindelof, directed the pilot episode, which was based upon an original script titled Nowhere written by Jeffrey Lieber. Six seasons of the show aired, in addition to numerous clip shows to recap previous episodes.

The series follows the experiences of the survivors of a plane crash on a passenger jet, Oceanic Flight 815, which crashed on a tropical island in the South Pacific, with each episode typically featuring action on the island as well as a secondary storyline from another point in a character's life. The series also includes stories of the lives of people already living on the island — they include the "Others", who initially antagonize the survivors, as well as a group of people who arrive on the freighter Kahana. Lost: Missing Pieces consists of thirteen original two- to three-minute clips referred to as "mobisodes" which were produced for cell phones and released between seasons three and four. Multiple former and recurring cast members made an appearance in the series finale.

Series overview

Episodes
In the following list, the term "featured character(s)" refers to the character or characters who are featured in the secondary storyline of each episode.

Season 1 (2004–05)

Season one aired from September 22, 2004, to May 25, 2005. In addition to the twenty-four regular episodes in season one, a special, "Lost: The Journey", aired on April 27, 2005, to put the mysteries of the island and the characters in perspective in the lead-up to the season finale.

Season one begins when a plane crash strands the surviving passengers of Oceanic Flight 815 on a seemingly deserted tropical island, forcing the group of strangers to work together to stay alive. However, their survival is threatened by several mysteries, including the contents of a hatch buried in the ground, an unknown entity that roams the jungle, and the motives of the inhabitants already living on the island known as the "Others". Season one covers a narrative time of 44 days.

The first season averaged 15.69 million viewers per episode. The average of the live ratings presented below for season one is 18.38 million viewers per episode.

Season 2 (2005–06)

Season two aired from September 21, 2005, to May 24, 2006. In addition to the twenty-three regular episodes, three specials were aired that provided recaps and insights into the show's mysteries. There were several cast changes in season two. Ian Somerhalder, who played Boone, left the show, while Malcolm David Kelley, who played Walt, only appeared in four episodes. Michelle Rodriguez, Adewale Akinnuoye-Agbaje and Cynthia Watros joined the main cast as Ana Lucia, Mr. Eko, and Libby, respectively.

Season two introduced several new characters to the series, including the plane's tail-section survivors and other island inhabitants. More island mythologies and insights into the survivors' pasts are divulged. The existence of the Dharma Initiative and its benefactor, the Hanso Foundation, is established. The truth about the "Others" begins to unfold. Season two takes place over 23 days.

The second season averaged a total of 15.50 million viewers. The average of the live ratings presented below for season two is 18.91 million viewers per episode.

Season 3 (2006–07)

Season three began airing on October 4, 2006, and ended on May 23, 2007. There were twenty-two episodes aired in two blocks. The first block consisted of six episodes and aired for six consecutive weeks. After a twelve-week break, the second block aired, and featured the remaining sixteen episodes. In addition to the twenty-two regular season episodes, two specials were aired. "Lost: A Tale of Survival" aired a week before the premiere, and "The Lost Survivor Guide" aired with episode seven, when the season returned from its twelve-week break.

Harold Perrineau Jr., Maggie Grace, Michelle Rodriguez, and Cynthia Watros, who played Michael, Shannon, Ana Lucia, and Libby, respectively, left the show after the second season. Michael Emerson, as Benjamin Linus (aka "Henry Gale"), and Henry Ian Cusick, as Desmond, became regular cast members in season three. Elizabeth Mitchell joined the main cast as Juliet, as did Kiele Sanchez and Rodrigo Santoro as previously unseen crash survivors Nikki and Paulo respectively.

Season three continues the story 67 days after the crash. The season begins where the second season left off: three of the crash survivors are held in captivity by the mysterious Others. More backstory on the Others, as well as the Dharma Initiative, is revealed. The survivors face continuous threats from their enemies, and also from their friends. The survivors attempt to make contact with a freighter which they believe is there to rescue them. Season three takes place over 24 days.

The third season averaged a total of 17.84 million viewers. The average of the live ratings presented below for season three is 13.74 million viewers per episode.

Season 4 (2008)

Season four began airing on January 31, 2008, and concluded on May 29, 2008. Production began in August 2007 and was prematurely stopped in November 2007 due to the 2007–2008 Writers Guild of America strike. The original plan was to air all sixteen episodes in one consecutive block, uninterrupted by repeats. After the strike was resolved, it was decided that the remaining story for the season would be condensed into what co-creator Damon Lindelof called a "lean, mean five". This would include a three-hour finale, after Lindelof and Carlton Cuse petitioned ABC. Due to the time lost to the strike there was a mini-hiatus after the eighth episode had aired. The series resumed with its post-strike episodes on April 24, 2008.

Adewale Akinnuoye-Agbaje, Dominic Monaghan, and Kiele Sanchez and Rodrigo Santoro, who played Mr. Eko, Charlie, and Nikki and Paulo, respectively, left the cast during the third season, and Harold Perrineau rejoined the main cast as Michael. Alongside Perrineau, three new actors joined the main cast. Jeremy Davies, Ken Leung, and Rebecca Mader play Daniel Faraday, Miles Straume, and Charlotte Lewis respectively.

Season 4 continues the story 91 days after the crash. The season focuses on the survivors splitting into two groups, after making contact with a freighter off-shore. Throughout the season, flashforwards show the lives of the "Oceanic Six", five original survivors and Aaron who make it off the island and have returned to their old lives. The season takes place over 17 days.

The fourth season averaged a total of 13.40 million viewers. The average of the live ratings presented below for season four is 12.73 million viewers per episode.

Season 5 (2009)

Season five began airing on January 21, 2009, and ended on May 13, 2009, featuring seventeen episodes. A clip show recapping the first four seasons preceded the premiere. Season five follows two time lines. The first takes place on the island, where the remaining survivors begin to erratically jump forward and backward through time, following the island being moved in both space and time by Ben, and focuses on the events that lead up to Locke stopping the time jumps and leaving the Island. The second takes place off the island following Locke's death and deals with Jack and Ben's attempt to reunite the Oceanic Six and return to the island with Locke's dead body. The second part of the season starts after the time jumps end and the Oceanic Six return to the island on Ajira Airways Flight 316. The show continues to follow two time lines, both of which take place on the island. The first takes place in 1977 when the survivors who had been left behind are stranded after jumping around in time. It is also where some of the Oceanic Six are transported during the return flight to the island. The second takes place in late 2007 after Flight 316 is forced to crash land on the island.

Harold Perrineau, who plays Michael Dawson, left the cast at the conclusion of the fourth season. Emilie de Ravin, who plays Claire Littleton, was placed on a holding contract, but she returned in the sixth and final season of Lost as a main cast member.

The fifth season averaged a total of 10.94 million viewers. The average of the live ratings presented below for season five is 9.89 million viewers per episode.

Season 6 (2010)

The sixth and final season premiered on February 2, 2010, with a two-hour premiere preceded by a one-hour clip show.  The show continued from February 9, 2010, at its new time slot of Tuesdays at 9:00 pm with a total of 18 episodes airing in 16 broadcasts, and ended with a four-and-a-half-hour series finale on Sunday, May 23, 2010. The finale began with a two-hour recap special, and continued with the two-and-a-half-hour final episode.

This season introduced "flash-sideways."  It represents a world created by the collective minds of the Oceanic 815 survivors for their souls to find one another in the afterlife and to remember their previous lives together, as revealed in the finale.

Jeremy Davies, Rebecca Mader, and Elizabeth Mitchell, who played Daniel Faraday, Charlotte Lewis, and Juliet Burke, respectively, left the show after the fifth season, but all three reprised their characters for the sixth. Former recurring cast members Nestor Carbonell, Jeff Fahey, and Zuleikha Robinson, who played the roles Richard Alpert, Frank Lapidus, and Ilana Verdansky, were promoted to the starring cast, and Emilie de Ravin returned as main character Claire Littleton after a year-long absence.

Multiple former and recurring cast members made an appearance in the final episode. For the special occasion, Sam Anderson, François Chau, L. Scott Caldwell, Jeremy Davies, Fionnula Flanagan, Maggie Grace, Rebecca Mader, Elizabeth Mitchell, Dominic Monaghan, Ian Somerhalder, John Terry, Sonya Walger, and Cynthia Watros were listed in the starring cast.

The sixth season totals an average of 10.08 million viewers. The average of the live ratings presented below for season six is 10.16 million viewers per episode.

Specials

Epilogue

Mobisodes: Lost: Missing Pieces

Lost: Missing Pieces consists of thirteen original two- to three-minute clips referred to as "mobisodes" which were produced for cell phones and released between seasons three and four. Six days after they became available for cell phones, they could be streamed from ABC.com. "Prod. no." stands for production code number, which indicates in what order the mobisodes were produced, and in the order they appear on the DVD and Blu-ray.

Recap specials
This section indexes official specials and recap episodes that were made specifically by the Lost team. Technically, these episodes are clip shows, but to distance them from the negative stereotypes clip shows receive, they are described as recap specials.

References

External links

List of Lost episodes at Lostpedia

 
Lists of American drama television series episodes
Lists of American mystery television series episodes
Lists of American science fiction television series episodes